The 690s decade ran from January 1, 690, to December 31, 699.

Significant people
 Abd al-Malik caliph
 Abd al-Aziz ibn Marwan famous governor of Egypt
 Justinian II Byzantine emperor
 Pope Conon of Rome

References

Sources